Lintu is a Finnish language surname from the Finnish word for bird. Notable people with the name include:
 Hannu Lintu (1967), Finnish conductor
 Pekka Lintu (1947), Finnish diplomat

References 

Finnish-language surnames
Surnames from nicknames